The Slovak Democratic Coalition (SDK) was a political party in Slovakia, which existed from 1998 to 2002.

SDK coalition

The SDK was founded on 3 July 1997 as an electoral coalition, from the five political parties, namely Democratic Union, Christian Democratic Movement, Democratic Party, Social Democratic Party of Slovakia and Green Party in Slovakia. It had great chance to win parliament elections in 1998. The leaders of this coalition were chiefs of respective parties, with Mikuláš Dzurinda as its speaker. The ruling government coalition with the Movement for a Democratic Slovakia as a leader, in response passed a law, which restricted candidature of such coalitions.

As a reaction of passing an "anti-coalition" law, the SDK transferred itself from electoral coalition into a political party with 150 members, with each one being a candidate into the parliament.

SDK in government

Although Movement for a Democratic Slovakia narrowly won the parliamentary election in 1998 with 27% of the vote, it was unable to form a government coalition. Instead, the SDK, which finished second with 26.33% of the vote formed government coalition with three other parties - Party of the Democratic Left (SDĽ) (14.66%), Party of the Hungarian Coalition (SMK) (9.12%) and Party of Civic Understanding (SOP) (8.01%). The new government gained nickname "Government of Changes", from its election campaign, with Mikuláš Dzurinda as its prime minister.

The party formally ceased to exist on August 2002, shortly before the elections in 2002, although it started to dissolve in 2000/2001, when some of the members left the party to join the newly established Slovak Democratic and Christian Union.

References
This article was translated from the corresponding article from the Slovak Wikipedia.

Defunct political parties in Slovakia
Political party alliances in Slovakia
Christian Democratic Movement
Slovak Democratic and Christian Union – Democratic Party
Political parties established in 1997
Political parties disestablished in 2002
1997 establishments in Slovakia